Géza Bereményi (born 25 January 1946) is a Hungarian writer, screenwriter and film director. He was awarded Best European Director for his film Eldorado at the 2nd European Film Awards.

Biography 
Born as Géza Vetró (his forefather, master builder Giovanni Vetro Vetro settled here in the early 18th century), his father, id. His father, Géza Vetró, escaped from the military draft in Romania to Transylvania, Hungary, and after the birth of his son, he escaped from the SAS draft. His mother was Éva Mária Bereményi. Until the age of six, she was raised by her maternal grandparents, Sándor and Róza Bereményi, at 9 Teleki tér.

References

External links
 

1946 births
Living people
Writers from Budapest
Hungarian screenwriters
Male screenwriters
Hungarian male writers
Hungarian film directors
European Film Award for Best Director winners